Cornel Dumitru Puchianu (born 27 October 1989 in Brașov) is a Romanian winter-sportsman who debuted in biathlon in 2012. He had previously competed in cross-country skiing. He competed for Romania at the 2014 Winter Olympics and the 2018 Winter Olympics. He won the bronze medal in sprint at the Summer Biathlon World Championships 2021.

Biathlon results
All results are sourced from the International Biathlon Union.

Olympic Games
0 medals

*The mixed relay was added as an event in 2014.

World Championships
0 medals

*During Olympic seasons competitions are only held for those events not included in the Olympic program.
**The single mixed relay was added as an event in 2019.

References

External links 
 
 
 
 
 

Olympic biathletes of Romania
Sportspeople from Brașov
1989 births
Living people
Biathletes at the 2014 Winter Olympics
Biathletes at the 2018 Winter Olympics
Romanian male biathletes